The Cherry Hill Rookies were an American basketball team based in Cherry Hill, New Jersey that was a member of the Eastern Basketball Association.  The team changed its name to the Cherry Hill Pros for the 1974/75 season.

In 1974, legendary tough guy John Brisker played three games for Cherry Hill, after being demoted by the Seattle SuperSonics. Brisker scored 51 points in his first EBA game, 58 in his second and 29 in his third before returning to Seattle.

Year-by-year

References

Basketball teams in New Jersey
Defunct basketball teams in the United States
Cherry Hill, New Jersey